Thomas J. Valentino (April 27, 1907 - August 4, 1986) was an American businessman of Italian descent being amongst the first to develop libraries of sound effects and taped music.

Valentino was born in the outskirts of Palermo, Sicily; his family immigrated to the US in 1911. He began his career in the 1920s as a piano and organ tuner for Wurlitzer, tuning and servicing pianos on trans-Atlantic steamers docking in New York. In the 1930s he created live sound effects for Broadway productions while becoming a sales representative for Gennett Recordings. He started his own sound effects company named Thomas J. Valentino Inc., that now operated as simply Valentino Inc. He provided the sound effects for many Broadway shows, including The Heiress, Death of a Salesman, The Diary of Anne Frank, and The Glass Menagerie, eventually compiling a library of sound cues for hundreds of live shows. His sound effects library at the time was also available on 78 RPM records, which were sold to radio stations during the 1930s and 1940s being at the time the only broadcasting outlets. During the 1950s, with the advent of television, the "Valentino Sound Effects Library", marketed under the Major record label, became the preeminent source for pre-recorded sound effects for the broadcasting industry.

In 1958, in order to complement the pre-recorded sound effects audio cues he expanded into a similar product for music, establishing the "Valentino Production Music Library", again under the Major label.

He published, produced or acquired copyrights to an extensive collection of music with the music library being used in thousands of movies, television shows, cable productions, and educational and industrial programming around the world. It eventually came to represent the work of over 125 composers under the two publishing arms of Thomas J. Valentino Inc, the ASCAP affiliated arm and RFT Music Publishing, the BMI associated arm.

In the mid 1970s Valentino published more and more contemporary music entering the popular disco style of the period. He commissioned a student at the Manhattan School of Music, Walter Murphy, to compose a number of popular music themes to add to the music library.  A disco version of Beethoven's Fifth Symphony - "A Fifth of Beethoven" - became a No. 1 hit on the Billboard Hot 100 in 1976. "A Fifth of Beethoven" was included in the soundtrack album of the movie "Saturday Night Fever", which sold over 40 million copies over the years. With most of the songs done by the Bee Gees, this album ranks as the No. 1 best-selling soundtrack of all-time. Valentino served as a vice president of the Recording Industry Association of America during this time and in 1979 received a Grammy award as co-producer of the Album of the Year "Saturday Night Fever".

References

External links 
 Gs+J.+Valentino&printsec=abstract#v=onepage&q=Thomas%20J.%20Valentino&f=false/ TJ Valentino Patents

American music industry executives
1986 deaths
1907 births
Italian emigrants to the United States